Gustavus Michael George Hamilton-Russell, 10th Viscount Boyne KCVO, JP (10 December 1931 – 14 December 1995) was an Irish peer, soldier and banker.

Background
He was the son of Hon. Gustavus Lascelles Hamilton-Russell, oldest son of Gustavus Hamilton-Russell, 9th Viscount Boyne, and his wife Joan Verena Lloyd-Verney (1908–1938), only daughter of Sir Harry Lloyd-Verney by his wife Lady Joan Cuffe, elder daughter of Hamilton Cuffe, 5th Earl of Desart.

His father having died of wounds received at the Western Front in 1940, he succeeded his grandfather as viscount two years later. He was educated at Eton College and went then to the Royal Military Academy, Sandhurst. He studied later at the Royal Agricultural College.

Career
Boyne was commissioned into the Grenadier Guards in 1952 and retired as lieutenant. In 1961, he was nominated Justice of the Peace for Shropshire and in 1965, a Deputy Lieutenant for the same county. He became director of the National Westminster Bank in 1976, leaving in 1990. Boyne was appointed a Lord-in-waiting in 1981 and Lord Lieutenant of Shropshire in 1994, holding both posts until his death in 1995. Boyne was a Knight of the Venerable Order of Saint John, and in the latter year he was also awarded a Knight Commander of the Royal Victorian Order.

Family
On 11 April 1956, he married Rosemary Anne Stucley, second daughter of Sir Dennis Stucley, 5th Baronet. They had three daughters and a son. Boyne died aged 64, only days after his birthday and was succeeded in the viscountcy by his only son Gustavus.

References

External links

1931 births
1995 deaths
Alumni of the Royal Agricultural University
Knights Commander of the Royal Victorian Order
Knights of the Order of St John
Lord-Lieutenants of Shropshire
People educated at Eton College
Viscounts in the Peerage of Ireland
Grenadier Guards officers
Graduates of the Royal Military Academy Sandhurst